Keith Smith (born March 20, 1980) is former American football cornerback. He was drafted by the Detroit Lions in the third round of the 2004 NFL Draft. He played college football at McNeese State.

Smith was also a member of the San Francisco 49ers and Omaha Nighthawks.

Professional career

Detroit Lions
Keith Smith debuted for the Detroit Lions of the NFL in 2004. #23 was a solid backup for Detroit into 2008. In 2007, he returned an interception 64 yards for a touchdown.

San Francisco 49ers

As a free agent following the 2008 season, Keith Smith signed with the San Francisco 49ers. He had five tackles for them on 2010.

On June 18, 2010, San Francisco released Smith.

Omaha Nighthawks

Keith Smith was signed by the Omaha Nighthawks of the UFL on June 29, of 2011. With a #25 jersey on his back, Smith remained with Omaha through all of 2011.

References

External links
 Just Sports Stats

1980 births
Living people
American football cornerbacks
Detroit Lions players
McNeese Cowboys football players
Omaha Nighthawks players
San Francisco 49ers players
People from Leesville, Louisiana
Players of American football from Louisiana